Koen is a Dutch language given name and surname, popular in the Netherlands and Flanders. Although the earliest direct attestation comes from Oudenaarde, East Flanders in 1272, it is known to have been derived from the Proto-Germanic name *kōnja-, meaning "brave". The given name is often an abbreviation of Koenraad.

Kôen is a Romanization of an unrelated Japanese family name.

People with the given name
 Koen Andries, Belgian scientist
 Koen Barbé (born 1981), Belgian road bicycle racer
 Koen Bauweraerts (born 1983), Belgian hardstyle DJ and producer
 Koen Beeckman (born 1973), Belgian road bicycle racer
 Koen van der Biezen (born 1985), Dutch footballer
 Koen Bouwman (born 1993), Dutch cyclist
 Koen Casteels (born 1992), Belgian footballer
 Koen Crucke (born 1952), Belgian tenor, actor and politician
 Koen Daerden (born 1982), Belgian footballer
 Koen De Bouw (born 1964), Flemish actor
 Koen De Graeve (born 1972), Belgian actor
 Koen de Kort (born 1982), Dutch cyclist
 Koen Decoster, Belgian historian, philosopher and translator
 Koen Geens (born 1958), Belgian Flemish politician
 Koen Heldens (born 1986), Dutch mixing engineer
 Koen Huntelaar (born 1998), Dutch footballer
 Koen Kessels (born c. 1960), Belgian conductor and music director
 Koen Lamberts, Belgian psychologist
 Koen Lenaerts (born 1954), Belgian law scholar and judge
 Koen Naert (born 1989), Belgian long-distance runner
 Koen Olthuis (born 1971), Dutch architect
 Koen Onzia (born 1961), Belgian ballet dancer
 Koen Peeters (born 1959), Belgian writer
 Koen Pijpers (born 1969), Dutch field hockey player
 Koen Ridder (born 1985), Dutch badminton player
 Koen Schockaert (born 1978), Belgian footballer
 Koen Sleeckx (born 1975), Belgian judoka
 Koen Stam (born 1987), Dutch footballer
 Koen Van Langendonck (born 1989), Belgian footballer
 Koen Vandenbempt (born ca. 1970), Belgian organizational theorist
 Koen Vanmechelen (born 1965), Belgian artist
 Koen van de Laak (born 1982), Dutch footballer
 Koen van Nol (born 1974), Dutch judoka
 Koen van Velsen (born 1952), Dutch architect
 Koen Vervaeke (born 1959), Belgian diplomat
 Koen Verweij (born 1990), Dutch speed skater
 Koen Wauters (born 1967), Belgian singer and television presenter
 Koen Weuts (born 1990), Belgian footballer

Fictional characters
 Koen West, protagonist of the Australian television series Cleverman

People with the surname Koen
 Charles Koen (born 1945), American civil rights activist
 Erwin Koen (born 1978), Dutch footballer
 Fanny Koen, later Fanny Blankers-Koen (1918–2004), Dutch athlete
 J. P. Koen (born 1983), South African rugby player
 Karleen Koen (born 1948), American novelist
 Louis Koen (cricketer) (born 1967), South African cricketer
 Louis Koen (rugby union) (born 1975), South African rugby player
 Martsel Koen (born 1933), Bulgarian sports shooter
 Matilda Koen-Sarano (born 1939), Israeli writer
 Shaun Koen (born 1970), South African professional wrestler
 Sias Koen (born 1994), South African rugby player
 Tyron Koen (born 1997), South African cricketer

People with the surname Kôen 
 Kôen Kondo (born 1978), Japanese actor
 Kôen Ryōsuke (born 1948), Japanese mail artist known as Ryosuke Cohen

See also
 Koen, Colorado
 Koen Creek, Missouri
 Coen (disambiguation)

References

Dutch masculine given names
Dutch-language surnames